Dimitri Komarov ( (Dmytro Komarov); born 1 December 1968) is a Ukrainian chess grandmaster (1994). He was the Ukrainian Chess Champion in 1983.

Chess career
Born in 1968, he won the Ukrainian Chess Championship in 1983, sharing first with Valeriy Neverov. Komarov earned his international master title in 1990 and his grandmaster title in 1994. He won the Reggio Emilia chess tournament of 1997–98. He is the No. 46 ranked Ukrainian player as of June 2020. He is coaching Indian grandmaster Nihal Sarin since 2016.

References

External links

1968 births
Living people
Chess grandmasters
Ukrainian chess players